Julie A. Leary is a Emeritus Professor in the Department of Molecular and Cellular Biology at University of California, Davis and the Department of Chemistry.

Early life and education 
Leary obtained a PhD in Chemistry Massachusetts Institute of Technology in 1985, under the direction of Klaus Biemann.

Career and research interests 
 Proteomics
 Glycomics
 https://www.researchgate.net/scientific-contributions/Julie-A-Leary-38178727
Leary served as a Member-at-Large for Education for the American Society for Mass Spectrometry (2001-2002).

Awards 
 2000 Biemann Medal
 2010 Fellow of the American Association for the Advancement of Science (AAAS)

References

21st-century American chemists
Massachusetts Institute of Technology alumni
Mass spectrometrists
Living people
University of California, Davis faculty
Year of birth missing (living people)